An oloid is a three-dimensional curved geometric object that was discovered by Paul Schatz in 1929. It is the convex hull of a skeletal frame made by placing two linked congruent circles in perpendicular planes, so that the center of each circle lies on the edge of the other circle. The distance between the circle centers equals the radius of the circles. One third of each circle's perimeter lies inside the convex hull, so the same shape may be also formed as the convex hull of the two remaining circular arcs each spanning an angle of 4π/3.

Surface area and volume
The surface area of an oloid is given by:

exactly the same as the surface area of a sphere with the same radius. In closed form, the enclosed volume is
,
where  and  denote the complete elliptic integrals of the first and second kind respectively.
A numerical calculation gives
.

Kinetics
The surface of the oloid is a developable surface, meaning that patches of the surface can be flattened into a plane. While rolling, it develops its entire surface: every point of the surface of the oloid touches the plane on which it is rolling, at some point during the rolling movement. Unlike most axial symmetric objects (cylinder, sphere etc.), while rolling on a flat surface, its center of mass performs a meander motion rather than a linear one. In each rolling cycle, the distance between the oloid's center of mass and the rolling surface has two minima and two maxima. The difference between the maximum and the minimum height is given by
,
where  is the oloid's circular arcs radius. Since this difference is fairly small, the oloid's rolling motion is relatively smooth.

At each point during this rolling motion, the oloid touches the plane in a line segment. The length of this segment stays unchanged throughout the motion, and is given by:
.

Related shapes

The sphericon is the convex hull of two semicircles on perpendicular planes, with centers at a single point. Its surface consists of the pieces of four cones. It resembles the oloid in shape and, like it, is a developable surface that can be developed by rolling. However, its equator is a square with four sharp corners, unlike the oloid which does not have sharp corners.

Another object called the two circle roller is defined from two perpendicular circles for which the distance between their centers is √2 times their radius, farther apart than the oloid.
It can either be formed (like the oloid) as the convex hull of the circles, or by using only the two disks bounded by the two circles. Unlike the oloid its center of gravity stays at a constant distance from the floor, so it rolls more smoothly than the oloid.

In popular culture
In 1979, modern dancer Alan Boeding designed his "Circle Walker" sculpture from two crosswise semicircles, forming a skeletal version of the sphericon, a shape with a similar rolling motion to the oloid. He began dancing with a scaled-up version of the sculpture in 1980 as part of an MFA program in sculpture at Indiana University, and after he joined the MOMIX dance company in 1984 the piece became incorporated into the company's performances. The company's later piece "Dream Catcher" is based around another Boeding sculpture whose linked teardrop shapes incorporate the skeleton and rolling motion of the oloid.

References

External links

Rolling oloid, filmed at Swiss Science Center Technorama, Winterthur, Switzerland.
Paper model oloid Make your own oloid
Oloid mesh Polygon mesh of the oloid, and code to generate it.

Geometric shapes
Articles containing video clips